Peter Willis (1937–2021) was an English football referee.

Peter Willis may also refer to:

Pete Willis (born 1960), English musician and songwriter
Peter Tom Willis (born 1967), American football quarterback
Peter Willis (journalist) (1966–2021), British journalist and newspaper editor

See also 
Peter Wallis (diplomat) (born 1935), British diplomat